The 2005 Pro Bowl was the NFL's all-star game for the 2004 season. The game was played February 13, 2005, at Aloha Stadium in Honolulu, Hawaii.  The final score was AFC 38 – NFC 27.  The most valuable player was Peyton Manning of the Colts.  The game holds the record as the latest Pro Bowl played during the calendar year, and formerly the latest NFL game; this record was subsequently tied when Super Bowl LVI was played on February 13, 2022.

Game summary
The game started off slowly. The AFC was forced to punt away its first possession, and the NFC missed a field goal from 43 yards out.  Two plays later, the AFC opened up scoring with a 62-yard pass from Peyton Manning to his Indianapolis Colts teammate, Marvin Harrison.  The NFC drove back quickly, but Donovan McNabb's pass was intercepted by Joey Porter.  Manning then hooked up with Hines Ward for a 41-yard score, and the AFC led 14–0.  The NFC came back with a time consuming drive that spanned the end of the first quarter to the beginning of the second, and ended with a 12-yard run by Brian Westbrook to bring the NFC within 7.  However, David Akers' attempted onside kick would prove costly, as Ward recovered the kick and returned it 39 yards for a score, the first ever kickoff return for a touchdown in Pro Bowl history.  Daunte Culpepper attempted to bring the NFC back, but was intercepted by Takeo Spikes.  That interception led to another Manning touchdown, this time a 12-yard pass to Antonio Gates which gave the AFC a comfortable 28–7 lead.  The NFC once again came down the field, led by Culpepper, but the drive was not without problems.  On the second play, Torry Holt caught a pass but was hit by Tory James, causing a fumble.  John Lynch recovered the fumble for the AFC, but the play was negated after a penalty on Marcus Stroud.  Akers ended up kicking a 33-yard field goal to bring the score to 28–10, which is how the first half ended.

The third quarter was all NFC, who started off the half by scoring within the first 3 minutes, when Michael Vick hit Holt with a 27-yard pass to make the score 28–17.  They later picked off Tom Brady when Lito Sheppard intercepted a pass on the NFC 31.  The drive ended when Vick ran it in from 3 yards out, making the score 28–24.  Adam Vinatieri and Akers then traded field goals before LaDainian Tomlinson added a rushing touchdown to make the score 38–27.  The NFC made one final drive late in the game, but Vick was intercepted (the third pick of the game for the AFC) by Nate Clements, and Drew Brees kneeled to end the game.  Manning, whose 3 passing TDs led the AFC's offense, won the Most Valuable Player award while Vick was called the greatest of all time by the announcers.

Scoring Summary
AFC – TD Marvin Harrison 62 yd pass from Peyton Manning (Adam Vinatieri kick) – 8:44 1st
AFC – TD Hines Ward 41 yd pass from Peyton Manning (Vinatieri kick) – 2:57 1st
NFC – TD Brian Westbrook 12 yd run (David Akers kick) – 12:15 2nd
AFC – TD Hines Ward 39 yd kickoff return (Vinatieri kick) – 12:01 2nd
AFC – TD Antonio Gates 12 yd pass from Peyton Manning (Vinatieri kick) – 6:01 2nd
NFC – FG David Akers 33 yd – 1:45 2nd
NFC – TD Torry Holt 27 yd pass from Michael Vick (Akers kick) – 11:19 3rd
NFC – TD Michael Vick 3 yd run (Akers kick) – 4:10 3rd
AFC – FG Adam Vinatieri 44 yd – 14:19 4th
NFC – FG David Akers 29 yd – 9:07 4th
AFC – TD LaDainian Tomlinson 4 yd run (Vinatieri kick) – 5:56 4th

AFC roster

Offense

Source

Defense

Special teams

Source

NFC roster

Offense

Defense

Special teams

Source

Notes:
Replacement selection due to injury or vacancy
Injured player; selected but did not play
Replacement starter; selected as reserve
"Need player"; named by coach

Number of selections per team

Officials
Referee: Bernie Kukar
Umpire: Roy Ellison
Head Linesman: Ed Camp
Line Judge: Chuck Stewart
Field Judge: Scott Edwards
Side Judge: Joe Larrew
Back Judge: Jim Howey

2005 Pro Bowl Cheerleading Squad

Heather Joy, Arizona Cardinals
Kim Kennedy, Atlanta Falcons
Jamie R, Buffalo Bills
Shannon McClattie, Carolina Panthers
Tara Wilson, Cincinnati Bengals
Brandi Redmond, Dallas Cowboys
Sarah Silva, Denver Broncos
Julie Rainbolt, Houston Texans
Jennifer Trock, Indianapolis Colts
Jill Cottingham, Jacksonville Jaguars
Kendrea White, Kansas City Chiefs
Jackie Villarino, Miami Dolphins
Erin Frey, Minnesota Vikings
Allison Preston, New England Patriots
Deryn Derbigny, New Orleans Saints
Kristin Medwick, Oakland Raiders
Monica Devlin, Philadelphia Eagles
Lisa Simmons, San Diego Chargers
Jany Collaco, San Francisco 49ers
Kiara Bright, Seattle Seahawks
Sommer Harris, St. Louis Rams
Leigh Vollmer, Tampa Bay Buccaneers
Jenita Smith, Tennessee Titans
Jamilla Keene, Washington Redskins
Brandi Redmond, Dallas Cowboys

Stats 

Most players selected from one team:
AFC: Pittsburgh Steelers, 9
NFC: Philadelphia Eagles, 10
Most starters from one team:
AFC Offense: Indianapolis Colts, 3 (Manning, Harrison, Glenn)
AFC Defense: Baltimore Ravens, Buffalo Bills, and Denver Broncos, 2 each
NFC Offense: Green Bay Packers, 4 (Green, Walker, Henderson, Rivera)
NFC Defense: Philadelphia Eagles, 3 (Dawkins, Sheppard, Lewis)
First time selections:
AFC: 17 (7 starters)
NFC: 17 (11 starters)
JC Chasez of *NSYNC was originally slated to perform at halftime, but because of the Super Bowl XXXVIII halftime show controversy (which coincidentally involved another former *NSYNC member, Justin Timberlake), he was asked not to perform (due to the raunchy lyrics of his hit song, "Some Girls Dance With Women").  The NFL asked him to sing the Star-Spangled Banner instead, and he refused.  The national anthem was instead performed by Jason Mraz. Halftime entertainment was provided by Don Ho, Jasmine Trias and Kapena in the "Idols and Legends of Aloha" halftime show.
This game marked the latest the NFL schedule has ever gone, February 13.

References

External links

Pro Bowl 2005 info

Pro Bowl
Pro Bowl
Pro Bowl
Pro Bowl
Pro Bowl
American football competitions in Honolulu
February 2005 sports events in the United States